Jordan Jamal Turner (born 9 January 1989) is a professional rugby league footballer who plays as a  or er for the Castleford Tigers in the Super League and the Jamaica national team.

He has also represented the England Knights at international level. He previously played for the Salford City Reds, Hull F.C., St Helens (Heritage № 1199) and the Huddersfield Giants in the Super League. He spent time with the Canberra Raiders in the National Rugby League, earning a place in the World All Stars team in 2017.

Background
Turner was born in Oldham, Greater Manchester, England. He attended the Radclyffe School.

His mother was born in Wollongong in Australia while his grandparents are Jamaican.

Playing career

Salford City Reds
Turner first joined Salford City Reds at the age of 14 from his amateur club Waterhead A.R.L.F.C. (in Waterhead, Greater Manchester, Oldham). He captained the England Under-18s team and was voted Academy Player and Young Player of the Year in 2007, before establishing himself in the Salford City Reds' first team for 2 seasons.

Hull
Turner joined Hull F.C. from Salford City Reds at the start of the 2010 season. Twice in 2012 Turner played for the England Knights team.
In July 2012, Turner signed a 2-year contract with St. Helens starting from 2013 season.

St. Helens
Turner was voted St Helens Player of the Season for 2013.

After 9 consecutive wins in the 2014 season (1 in the Challenge Cup) the Saints lost 2 consecutive games against Wigan Warriors and Widnes Vikings. Jordan was determined to make the club bounce back from two moral killer defeats. As of 24 April 2014, Jordan has scored three tries this season (all in the Super League) against Wigan, Catalans Dragons and Castleford Tigers.

Canberra Raiders
On 14 July 2016 he signed with NRL club the Canberra Raiders for two seasons.

Huddersfield Giants
On 26 May 2017, it was announced that Turner had signed for Super League side the Huddersfield Giants on a three and a half year contract. He made his début on Sunday 4 June against Warrington Wolves, scoring a try in the side's 44-4 home win.

Castleford Tigers
In November 2020, it was announced that Turner had signed for the Castleford Tigers (Heritage № 1005) on a one-year deal.

In May 2021, Turner signed a new two-year deal with Castleford. In the 2021 Challenge Cup semi-final, Turner scored a hat-trick as Castleford defeated Warrington 35-20. On 17 July 2021, he played for Castleford in their 2021 Challenge Cup Final loss against St Helens.

On 15 October 2021, Turner made his début for the Jamaica national team against the England Knights at Wheldon Road for his testimonial match.

References

External links
Castleford Tigers profile
Huddersfield Giants profile
Canberra Raiders profile
(archived by web.archive.org) Salford City Reds profile
SL profile
Saints Heritage Society profile

1989 births
Living people
Black British sportspeople
Castleford Tigers players
England Knights national rugby league team players
English rugby league players
English people of Australian descent
English people of Jamaican descent
Huddersfield Giants players
Hull F.C. players
NRL All Stars players
Rugby league players from Oldham
Rugby league centres
Rugby articles needing expert attention
Salford Red Devils players
St Helens R.F.C. players
Jamaica national rugby league team players